Neeshan Prabhoo, also known as "The Hitman" or "D'Hitman" is a chutney musician.

References

Trinidad and Tobago musicians
Chutney musicians
Trinidad and Tobago Hindus
Living people
Trinidad and Tobago people of Indian descent
Year of birth missing (living people)